Kevin Kangas is an American film maker. He is a screenwriter and director of horror films and films about serial killers. Many of his films have been shot in his home state of Maryland.

Filmography

Writer 
 Red Fish Blue Fish (2011) (in production) (writer)
 Garden of Hedon (2011) (co-writer)
 Bounty (2010) (screenplay)
 Fear of Clowns 2 (2007) (writer)
 Fear of Clowns (2004) (writer)
 Hunting Humans (2002) (writer)
 Terrortory (writer,)

Producer 
 Terrortory (producer,)
 Bounty (2010) (producer)
 Fear of Clowns 2 (2007) (executive producer)
 Fear of Clowns (2004) (producer)
 Hunting Humans (2002) (producer)

Director 
 Terrortory (2014, segment: Smiling Jack)
 Garden of Hedon (2011)
 Bounty (2010)
 Fear of Clowns 2 (2007)
 Fear of Clowns (2004)
 Hunting Humans (2002)

References

External links

 Kangas Kahn Films Official Website

Living people
American film directors
Place of birth missing (living people)
Year of birth missing (living people)